Theta Cygni (θ Cygni, θ Cyg) is a star in the northern constellation of Cygnus. It has an apparent visual magnitude of 4.5, so it can be seen from the northern hemisphere with the naked eye in sufficiently dark skies. It is suspected of hosting an extrasolar planet.

Properties
The spectrum of the primary star matches a stellar classification of F3 V. The luminosity class 'V' is associated with a category of stars called main sequence, which, like the Sun, are generating energy through the nuclear fusion of hydrogen at their cores. The outer envelope of this star is radiating 4.2 times the luminosity of the Sun at an effective temperature of about 6,381 K, which gives it the yellow-white hue typical of F-type stars. Theta Cygni is larger than the Sun, with about 38% more mass and a 58% greater radius. The estimated age of this star is probably in the range of 0.6–1.9 billion years.

Companions
θ Cygni has several faint companions. The closest is θ Cygni B, a 13th magnitude red dwarf around 3" distant, and believed to be in orbit around 46 AU from θ Cygni. A 12th magnitude star around an arc minute distant is catalogued as component C and is believed to be an optical companion. Component D is a magnitude 12.5 star also thought to be an optical companion. GJ 765B, not to be confused with θ Cygni B, is 13th magnitude and a possible subdwarf companion. GSC 03564-00642 is another 13th magnitude red dwarf and thought to be a common proper montion companion to θ Cygni.

θ Cygni B has an apparent visual magnitude of 13.03, which is too faint to be seen without a telescope. It has a stellar classification of M3 V and an estimated mass of about 0.33 times the mass of the Sun. θ Cygni A and B are traveling together through space with a high proper motion of 0.261 arcseconds per year, or 0.4° per century. It is possible that θ Cygni B is itself a close binary containing two red dwarfs, each of which would be fainter and less massive than calculated for a single star.

Possible planetary companion
Radial velocity variations of Theta Cygni have been detected by the ELODIE team while searching of extrasolar planets. Desort et al. (2009) infer these variations are not caused by a dim stellar companion roughly 80 Astronomical Units away from the star, but suggest instead the presence of a perturbing planetary object, twice as massive as Jupiter and orbiting around the primary star in roughly 150 days. This extrasolar planet has yet to be confirmed. Observations made at Lick Observatory show evidence for radial velocity variation at this period as well as at yearly aliases, however these signals have not reached statistical significance.

References

Cygnus (constellation)
Cygni, Theta
Cygni, 13
F-type main-sequence stars
Hypothetical planetary systems
0765
096441
185395
BD+49 3062
7469
M-type main-sequence stars